The Linus Pauling Award is an award recognizing outstanding achievement in chemistry. It is awarded annually by the  Puget Sound, Oregon, and Portland sections of the American Chemical Society, and is named after the US chemist Linus Pauling (1901–1994), to whom it was first awarded in 1966.

Another Linus Pauling Award is given annually by the Chemistry Department at Buffalo State College.

Oregon Laureates
Source: ACS

See also

 List of chemistry awards

References

Sources
Linus Pauling Medalists, Portland State University Chemistry Department
Linus Pauling Award, Buffalo State University Chemistry Department
Linus Pauling Award, University Washington
Linus Pauling Medal Award 2010
Linus Pauling Award 2011
Linus Pauling Award 2018

Awards of the American Chemical Society